Under World is a 2019 Indian Malayalam-language action-gangster drama film directed by  Arun Kumar Aravind, written by Shibin Francis and starring  Asif Ali, Samyuktha Menon, Farhaan Faasil, Mukesh, and Jean Paul Lal in the lead roles. The film was released on 1 November 2019 and received mixed reviews from both the audience and critics but became a flop at the box-office

Premise
Stalin and Majeed are two young gangsters who want to earn quick money through any means possible. However, things take a turn when they cross paths with Padmanabhan and Solomon.

Cast 

Asif Ali as Stalin John
Farhaan Faasil as Majeed
Mukesh as Padhmanabhan Nair
Samyuktha as Aishwarya
Jean Paul Lal as Solomon
Nishanth Sagar as Mani
Srikant Murali as Potti
Meghanathan as Shahul Hameed
Arun Cherukavil as Sadasivan
Muthumani as Adv. M. Padmavathi
Sreelakshmi as Stalin's mother
Meghanathan as Mehboob
Shivan V. Arun as Younger Farhaan
Bipin Chandran as Rajan Mulankadu
James Eliya as Mujeeb
John Vijay as Mohammed Sanafar
Alex J. Pulickal as Suhas
Vijayan as S I Prathapan
Kalabhavan Haneef as Barber
Pauly Valsan as Nurse

Additionally, Arjun Ashokan, Ganapathi S Poduval and Balu Varghese portrayed frog catchers in the film.

Reception

Critical response
The Times of India gave the film three out of five stars and wrote that "The Arun Kumar Aravind directorial, written by Shibin Francis, aptly fits into the genre of gang war movies and crime drama". On the contrary, The Hindu stated that "Riding high on its style quotient, accentuated by an effective background score, Underworld does not have the substance to make it a memorable take on the world of crime."

References

External links 

Indian gangster films
Films directed by Arun Kumar Aravind
2010s Malayalam-language films